"The Joke" is a song recorded by American singer-songwriter Brandi Carlile. It was co-written by Carlile, Dave Cobb, and Phil and Tim Hanseroth, and produced by Cobb and Shooter Jennings. It was released on November 13, 2017, as the lead single off By the Way, I Forgive You, Carlile's sixth album.  With music inspired by "An American Trilogy" by Elvis Presley, the lyrics are intended to uplift people who are marginalized by society.  The song received widespread critical acclaim, winning two Grammy awards.

Writing and production

"The Joke" first came about when Carlile and producer and co-writer Dave Cobb started talking about Carlile's most successful single, '"The Story". Carlile told NPR "it started off with Dave insinuating that we haven't had a vocal moment like "The Story" since, well, "The Story" [...] we all went home that night and I was like, who tells you to rewrite a song that you wrote a decade ago? But it just kept nagging me – like the truth does, you know".

Cobb later played her An American Trilogy by Elvis Presley during a session. Cobb explained, "I was playing her Elvis Presley's American Trilogy...there's something magical about that recording. I mean it's the way it affects you; the way it's big in the chords, just pulling every single emotion out of you. So I played that, and then she wrote "The Joke". [laughs] I played her one of the greatest songs of all time, and then she wrote one of the greatest written since that one".

Lyrically, the song uplifts people who struggle to fit the molds made for them by modern society. Carlile said on NPR of the track, "There are so many people feeling misrepresented [today] ... So many people feeling unloved. Boys feeling marginalized and forced into these kind of awkward shapes of masculinity that they do or don't belong in ... so many men and boys are trans or disabled or shy. Little girls who got so excited for the last election, and are dealing with the fallout. The song is just for people that feel under-represented, unloved or illegal."

Critical reception

The Joke was widely acclaimed by music critics, with major praise going for its melody and the subject matter in its lyrics. Magazine American Songwriter called the track's intensity "mind-blowing", and dubbed it "a true masterpiece". NPR lauded the single as "A country-rock aria dedicated to the delicate boys and striving girls born into — and, Carlile insists, destined to triumph over — this divisive time." Rolling Stone called the track an "anthemic ballad", and The A.V. Club described it as "a beacon of hope for those discouraged by today's political climate". Said Slant, "The song's chorus explodes with catharsis, big emotions that are earned by Carlile's storytelling but driven home by the cinematic arrangement." Billboard and American Songwriter ranked the song number three and number one, respectively, on their lists of the 10 greatest Brandi Carlile songs.

Accolades 
On December 7, 2018, the nominations for the 61st Annual Grammy Awards were revealed. "The Joke" was nominated in four categories, including Record of the Year and Song of the Year. Carlile was nominated for six awards total, making her the most nominated woman of 2019's ceremony. "The Joke" won the Grammy awards for Best American Roots Song and Best American Roots Performance.

Chart performance 
Following the song's wins and Carlile's performance of the song at the 2019 Grammys, "The Joke" debuted at number 1 on the February 23rd dated Billboard Rock Digital Song Sales chart. The song also re-entered the Hot Rock Songs chart at number 4, becoming Carlile's first song ever to reach the top 30.

Live performances 
On March 14, 2018, Carlile performed the song on The Late Show with Stephen Colbert, in November 2018, at the Americanafest, on February 10, 2019 at the 61st Grammy Awards and later, the same week, on The Ellen DeGeneres Show.

Charts

References
 

2017 songs
Grammy Award for Best American Roots Song
LGBT-related songs
Political songs
Song recordings produced by Dave Cobb
Songs against racism and xenophobia
Songs with feminist themes
Brandi Carlile songs
Songs written by Brandi Carlile
Elektra Records singles